Hakea 'Burrendong Beauty' is a hybrid between H. myrtoides and H. petiolaris and was discovered in the Burrendong Arboretum.

Description
It has deep pink,  globular shaped flower, cream styles that appear in clusters in the leaf axils during winter. The hybrid plant rarely sets seed.

Use in horticulture
This hybrid between two Western Australian species does not occur in nature but is well-established in general cultivation. It does best in areas of low summer humidity and requires well-drained soil in a sunny position.

References

myrtoides
petiolaris
Garden plants